University of Sydney, an electoral district of the Legislative Assembly in the Australian state of New South Wales, was created in 1876 and abolished in 1880.


Election results

Elections in the 1870s

1879 by-election

1877

1876 by-election

Notes
 -->

References

New South Wales state electoral results by district